Finley Jude William Back (born 25 September 2002) is an English professional footballer who plays for Carlisle United, on loan from Nottingham Forest.

Career

Nottingham Forest
Back joined the Nottingham Forest academy at the age of eight-years old. He went on to earn a professional contract with the club on 4 October 2019 after impressing with the club's under-18's. Back extended his deal with Forest on 13 July 2021. Back made his professional debut for Forest on 11 August 2021, starting in an EFL Cup fixture against Bradford City. His league debut followed on 18 August 2021 against Blackburn Rovers.

Carlisle United (loan)
On 14 July 2022, Back joined EFL League Two club Carlisle United on a season-long loan deal.

Personal life
Fin is the son of Neil Back MBE, who is a former international rugby union player for England and the British & Irish Lions who also played for Nottingham RFC and Leicester Tigers.

Fin was educated at Ratcliffe College in Leicestershire.

Career statistics

Honours
Nottingham Forest
EFL Championship play-offs: 2022

References

2002 births
Living people
People educated at Ratcliffe College
Association football midfielders
English footballers
Nottingham Forest F.C. players
Carlisle United F.C. players
English Football League players